The Labour, Democracy and Freedom Bloc (Turkish: Emek, Demokrasi ve Özgürlük Bloğu) was an electoral alliance formed by the pro-Kurdish Peace and Democracy Party (BDP) with several other smaller left-wing parties and political movements in Turkey. The alliance contested the 2011 general election by fielding candidates from participating parties as independents in order to bypass the 10% election threshold needed to win seats in the Turkish Grand National Assembly. The alliance won 5.67% of the vote, initially winning 36 MPs. The Supreme Electoral Council of Turkey later annulled the election of BDP MP Hatip Dicle in Diyarbakır, reducing the alliance's elected MPs to 35. The Bloc fielded 65 candidates in 41 provinces.

The main participants were the pro-Kurdish Peace and Democracy Party, the Labour Party (EMEP) and the Equality and Democracy Party (EDP). The EMEP had formed an alliance with the BDP's predecessor Democratic Society Party in the 2007 general election under the Thousand Hope Candidates banner. The EMEP leader Levent Tüzel, who failed to win election in 2007, was elected as an MP in 2011 as part of the Bloc. Several other smaller parties from left-wing origins were also part of the Bloc, though only the EMEP and the EDP had the right to contest the election as parties. The Labour Party fielded its own candidates as a party in provinces where the Bloc did not contest the election.

The alliance between several left-wing parties paved the way for the establishment of the Peoples' Democratic Congress. The Congress, in which many of the Bloc-supporting groups participated, established a political party named the Peoples' Democratic Party (HDP) in 2012. The HDP contested the June 2015 general election as a party with many of the Bloc parties support, winning 13.12% of the vote and ending the convention of fielding independent candidates for general elections.

2011 election
The Bloc won 5.67% of the vote, with 35 of their candidates elected. The elected candidates mostly came from the Kurdish south-east of the country.

Candidates

Adana: Murat Bozlak
Adıyaman: Veli Büyükşahin
Ağrı: Halil Aksoy
Ankara: Sadrettin Güvener, Gerciş Utaş
Antalya: İhsan Nergiz
Ardahan: Yüksel Avşar
Aydın: Mehmet Bayraktar
Balıkesir: Turan Cengiz
Batman: Bengi Yıldız, Ayla Akat Ata
Bingöl: İdris Baluken
Bitlis: Hüsamettin Zenderlioğlu
Bursa: Mehmet Deniz
Denizli: Kemal Beler
Diyarbakır: Leyla Zana, Hatip Dicle, Emine Ayna, Nursel Aydoğan, Altan Tan, Şerafettin Elçi
Erzurum: Sabahattin Yılmaz
Eskişehir: Hasan Yalçınkaya
Gaziantep: Akın Birdal
Hakkari: Selahattin Demirtaş, Adil Kurt, Esat Canan
Iğdır: Pervin Buldan
İstanbul: Levent Tüzel, Sırrı Süreyya Önder, Sebahat Tuncel

İzmir: Erdal Avcı, Mehmet Tanhan
Kahramanmaraş: Mustafa Mamaklı
Kars: Mülkiye Birtane
Kırşehir: Faik Karadaş
Kocaeli: Emrullah Bingöl
Konya: Hacı Mehmet Bozdağ
Malatya: Gani Rüzgar Şavata
Manisa: Ayşegül Öztürk
Mardin: Ahmet Türk, Gülser Yıldırım, Erol Dora
Mersin: Ertuğrul Kürkçü
Muğla: Şebal Şenyurt
Muş: Sırrı Sakık, Demir Çelik
Osmaniye: Kamuran Bablak
Sakarya: Hüseyin Tanış
Siirt: Gültan Kışanak
Şanlıurfa: İbrahim Binici, İbrahim Ayhan
Şırnak: Hasip Kaplan, Selma Irmak, Faysal Sarıyıldız
Tekirdağ: Kerem Tosun
Tunceli: Ferhat Tunç
Van: Kemal Aktaş, Özdal Üçer, Nazmi Gür, Aysel Tuğluk
Yalova: İhsan Coşkun

Not all of these candidates are BDP politicians. This includes Labour Party leader Levent Tüzel.

The following candidates were imprisoned due to the investigation into the KCK confederalist organisation. 
 Diyarbakır: Hatip Dicle
 Van: Kemal Aktaş
 Şırnak: Selma Irmak, Faysal Sarıyıldız
 Şanlıurfa: İbrahim Ayhan
 Mardin: Gülseren Yıldırım.

Elected members
Adana: Murat Bozlak
Ağrı: Halil Aksoy
Batman: Bengi Yıldız, Ayla Akat Ata
Bingöl: İdris Baluken
Bitlis: Hüsamettin Zenderlioğlu
Diyarbakır: Leyla Zana, Hatip Dicle, Emine Ayna, Nursel Aydoğan, Altan Tan, Şerafettin Elçi
Hakkari: Selahattin Demirtaş, Adil Kurt, Esat Canan
Iğdır: Pervin Buldan
İstanbul: Levent Tüzel, Sırrı Süreyya Önder, Sebahat Tuncel
Kars: Mülkiye Birtane
Mardin: Ahmet Türk, Gülser Yıldırım, Erol Dora
Mersin: Ertuğrul Kürkçü
Muş: Sırrı Sakık, Demir Çelik
Siirt: Gültan Kışanak
Şanlıurfa: İbrahim Binici, İbrahim Ayhan
Şırnak: Hasip Kaplan, Selma Irmak, Faysal Sarıyıldız
Van: Kemal Aktaş, Özdal Üçer, Nazmi Gür, Aysel Tuğluk

Votes won by participating parties elsewhere

See also
24th Parliament of Turkey
Electoral system of Turkey
Peoples' Democratic Congress
Peace and Democracy Party
Kurdish nationalism
Thousand Hope Candidates

References

External links
EMEP official website
The BDP, having been dissolved in 2014 and replaced by the Democratic Regions Party, no longer has an active website.

2011 establishments in Turkey
Defunct political party alliances in Turkey
Political parties established in 2011